The state of New Jersey in the United States owns and administers over  of land designated as "Wildlife Management Areas" (abbreviated as "WMA") throughout the state. These areas are managed by the New Jersey Division of Fish and Wildlife, an agency in the New Jersey Department of Environmental Protection. These protected areas are not part of the state's public parks and forests system, and while managed as fish and wildlife habitat with a focus on recreational fishing and hunting activities, these multi-use sites are also "prime locations for birding, wildlife viewing and photography, cross country skiing, hiking and mountain biking". All individuals partaking in these activities should familiarize themselves with all local fishing and hunting regulations, found on the NJDEP website  as well as NJ wildlife management area regulations which can also be found on the NJDEP website. WMA regulations include restricted hours, motor vehicle, boating, biking, and horseback riding guidelines, among other restrictions and regulations.  According to state wildlife education specialist Paul Tarlowe, the wildlife management areas reflect the varied and diverse terrain across the state, including "extremely rugged terrain (Wildcat Ridge WMA) to level woods roads (along the South Branch of the Raritan River through Ken Lockwood Gorge WMA) to sandy tracts in the Pinelands (Greenwood Forest and Stafford Forge WMAs) to coastal marshes (Cape May Wetlands WMA)." As of July 2015, there are 121 areas throughout the state and new properties and additions to existing properties are continually being added.

A majority of the wildlife management area properties are acquired through funding raised through the state's Green Acres Program. In association with public and private entities, the program aims to create "a system of interconnected open spaces, whose protection will preserve and enhance New Jersey's natural environment and its historic, scenic, and recreational resources for public use and enjoyment."

Several of the state's wildlife management areas are stocked with fish or game. Pheasants are raised at the Rockport Pheasant Farm and various fish species (including trout) are hatched and raised at the Pequest Trout Hatchery and Natural Resource Education Center and Charles O. Hayford State Fish Hatchery. All three facilities are located near Hackettstown in Warren County and operated by the Division of Fish and Wildlife. No state tax dollars are used to fund these facility's operations and the costs are raised through the sale of pheasant/quail stamps or trout stamp endorsements to state-issued hunting or fishing licenses to hunters and anglers.

List of wildlife management areas

See also
 New Jersey Division of Parks and Forestry
 List of New Jersey state parks
 National Wildlife Refuge

Notes

References

External links
 NJ.gov: New Jersey Division of Fish and Wildlife website
 NJ.gov: Green Acres Program
 State.nj: New Jersey Department of Environmental Protection website

 01
Wildlife management areas
Wildlife management areas
Wildlife management areas
New Jersey
New Jersey
Wildlife management areas
New Jersey